Satyajit Ray (2 May 1921 – 23 April 1992) was an Indian filmmaker who worked prominently in Bengali cinema and who has often been regarded as one of the greatest directors of world cinema. Ray was born in Calcutta (now Kolkata) to a Bengali family and started his career as a junior visualiser. His meeting with French film director Jean Renoir, who had come to Calcutta in 1949 to shoot his film The River (1951), and his 1950 visit to London, where he saw Vittorio De Sica's Ladri di biciclette (Bicycle Thieves) (1948), inspired Ray to become a film-maker. Ray made his directorial debut in 1955 with Pather Panchali and directed 36 films, comprising 29 feature films, five documentaries, and two short films.

Although Ray's work generally received critical acclaim, his film Pather Panchali and Ashani Sanket (1973) were criticised for "exporting poverty" and "distorting India's image abroad". His Apu Trilogy (1955–1959) appeared in Time All-Time 100 Movies in 2005. Aside from directing, Ray composed music and wrote screenplays for films, both his own and those by other directors. Often credited as a fiction writer, illustrator, and calligrapher; Ray authored several short stories and novels in Bengali, most of which were aimed at children and adolescents. Some of his short stories have been adapted into films by other directors, including his only son, Sandip Ray. Considered a cultural icon in India and acknowledged for his contribution to Indian cinema, Ray has influenced several filmmakers around the world, including Wes Anderson, Martin Scorsese, James Ivory, François Truffaut, Carlos Saura, and Christopher Nolan.

Ray intended to make various other films, including The Alien which inspired Steven Spielberg's 1982 film E.T.; a documentary on Indian sitar player Ravi Shankar; an adaptation of the ancient Indian epic, the Mahābhārata; and an adaptation of E. M. Forster's 1924 novel, A Passage to India. However, none had been started when he died in 1992.

Ray received numerous awards at international film festivals and elsewhere, including several Indian National Film Awards and an honorary Academy Award at the 64th Academy Awards in 1992. Ray was awarded India's highest award in cinema, the Dadasaheb Phalke Award, in 1984 and India's highest civilian award, Bharat Ratna, in 1992.

Key

Directed by Ray

Contributed to by Ray

See also

 Satyajit Ray
 Feluda
 Professor Shonku
 Bengali Science Fiction

Notes

References

Filmography, contributions and credits

Bibliography

External links
 
 SatyajitRay.org
 Satyajit Ray Film and Study Center: University of California - Santa Cruz
 Satyajit Ray society

Director filmographies
Indian filmographies
Satyajit Ray